
Gmina Zębowice, German Gemeinde Zembowitz is a rural gmina (administrative district) in Olesno County, Opole Voivodeship, in south-western Poland.

Since 2007 the commune, like much of the area, has been bilingual in German and Polish, a large German population remaining in the area after Silesia was partitioned to Poland.

Villages
The commune contains the villages and settlements of:

Zębowice
Borowiany
Kadłub Wolny
Knieja
Kosice
Łąka
Nowa Wieś
Osiecko
Poczołków
Prusków
Radawie
Radawka
Siedliska

Neighbouring gminas
Gmina Zębowice is bordered by the gminas of Dobrodzień, Lasowice Wielkie, Olesno, Ozimek and Turawa.

References

Zebowice
Olesno County